Events from the year 2019 in Austria.

Incumbents 

 President: Alexander Van der Bellen
 Chancellor: Sebastian Kurz (until 28 May), Brigitte Bierlein (from 3 June)

Governors 
 Burgenland: Hans Niessl (until 28 February); Hans Peter Doskozil (from 28 February)
 Carinthia: Peter Kaiser
 Lower Austria: Johanna Mikl-Leitner
 Salzburg: Wilfried Haslauer Jr.
 Styria: Hermann Schützenhöfer
 Tyrol: Günther Platter
 Upper Austria: Thomas Stelzer
 Vienna: Michael Ludwig
 Vorarlberg: Markus Wallner

Events 

 1 January - Same-sex marriage becomes legal in Austria.
 18 May – Vice chancellor and FPÖ leader Heinz-Christian Strache announces his resignation following the Ibiza affair, he and all of the other FPÖ cabinet members left the government 4 days later. This left Kurz government as a ÖVP minority government.
 28 May - Kurz government was dismissed after a motion of no confidence being passed.
 3 June - President Van der Bellen appointed former president of Constitutional Court Brigitte Bierlein as the first independent chancellor after WWII, as well as the first female to hold the office. She and her technocratic cabinet are expected to leave their positions when a new government is formed after the legislative election to be held in late September.
 1 November - Austria becomes one of the last European countries to ban smoking in bars and restaurants, after years of debate.

Sports 
20 February–3 March: The FIS Nordic World Ski Championships are held in Seefeld in Tirol.

Deaths 
20 May – Niki Lauda, 70, racing driver and airline owner, Formula One world champion (1975, 1977, 1984).

See also

 2019 European Parliament election

References

 
Years of the 21st century in Austria
Austria
Austria